Pierre Marchand may refer to:
 Pierre Marchand (born 1958), Canadian songwriter
 Pierre Marchand (fencer) (born 1948), French fencer
 Pierre Marchand (editor) (1939–2002), French publisher